Docs Okie Quixote (1980—1985), AQHA #1613457, was a sorrel Quarter Horse stallion.  In 1984, he became the second horse ever to win the NCHA Triple Crown (1983-1984), and 1st to be owned, trained, and ridden by the same person, Joe Heim, a cutting horse trainer from Thackerville, OK, and NCHA Riders Hall of Fame inductee.  The other two Triple Crown winners are Smart Little Lena, ridden by Bill Freeman (1982-1983); and Chiquita Pistol, ridden by Tag Rice (2002-2003). Docs Okie Quixote is an NCHA Horse Hall of Fame inductee.

Pedigree

References

NCHA Hall of Fame (horses)
Cutting horses